Clivipollia is a genus of sea snails, marine gastropod mollusks in the family Prodotiidae.

Species
Species within the genus Clivipollia include :
 Clivipollia costata (Pease, 1860)
 Clivipollia delicata Fraussen & Stahlschmidt, 2016
 Clivipollia fragaria (Wood, 1828)
 † Clivipollia gigas (Landau & Vermeij, 2012)
 Clivipollia incarnata (Deshayes, 1834)
 Clivipollia pulchra (Reeve, 1846)
Species brought into synonymy
 Clivipollia contracta (Reeve, 1846): synonym of Enzinopsis contracta (Reeve, 1846)
 Clivipollia imperita Iredale, 1929: synonym of Clivipollia pulchra (Reeve, 1846)
 Clivipollia recurva (Reeve, 1846): synonym of Speccapollia recurva (Reeve, 1846)
 Clivipollia thaanumi (Pilsbry & Brian, 1918): synonym of Clivipollia costata (Pease, 1860)
 Clivipollia tokiae Chino & Fraussen, 2015: synonym of Speccapollia tokiae (Chino & Fraussen, 2015) (original combination)

References

 Fraussen K. & Stahlschmidt P. (2016). Revision of the Clivipollia group (Gastropoda: Buccinidae: Pisaniinae) with description of two new genera and three new species. Novapex. 17(2-3): 29-46

External links
 Iredale T. (1929). Strange molluscs in Sydney Harbour. Australian Zoologist. 5(4): 337-352

Prodotiidae
Gastropod genera